Homaromyces is a genus of fungi in the family Laboulbeniaceae. A monotypic genus, Homaromyces contains the single species Homaromyces epieri.

References

External links
Homaromyces at Index Fungorum

Laboulbeniaceae
Monotypic Laboulbeniomycetes genera